Prank Patrol is a British version of the Canadian show of the same name. The show was made by Baker Media for CBBC which specialised in kids programming. It was hosted by Barney Harwood. It was produced by Baker Media in association with Apartment 11 Productions.

Format 
Based on the original Prank Patrol series, a child nominates his or her friend to play a prank on. Barney Harwood then arrives in his van with the Ninjas driving and organizes their Prank at Prank HQ. They usually are assisted by someone in that prank's area of expertise. After preparing everything it is then 'Prank Day' which is the day the prank will be executed.

Fillers

Recipe for a Prank
Similar to the original Canadian format this filler is an animated short of which explains how to set up one's own Prank.

Release The Ninjas
The Ninjas usually go to a public place and play a Prank whether it be hiding behind a park bench and making fart sounds or putting free drinks on a table with leaking cups. Stockport town centre in Greater Manchester was usually the location of these pranks.

Production 
Started to be aired on TV in May 2006 – May 2007. Prank Patrol was cancelled by the BBC due to an unconnected incident where Australian radio presenters fooled a hospital employee into believing they were members of the UK Royal Family so as to learn more about a member of the family who was undergoing treatment there. This employee then took her own life.

Episodes

Series 1: 2007

Series 2: 2007

Series 3: 2010

References

External links 
 

2000s British children's television series
2010s British children's television series
2007 British television series debuts
2010 British television series endings
BBC children's television shows
Hidden camera television series